Huashan Subdistrict is a subdistrict in Louxing District of Loudi City, Hunan Province, People's Republic of China.

Administrative division
The subdistrict is divided into 10 communities, the following areas: 
 Tiedong Community
 Tiexi Community
 Shentongwan Community
 Daqiao Community
 Huashan Community
 Qingtan Community
 Shantang Community
 Sitang Community
 Guanhua Community
 Duijiang Community

Geography
Lianshui River flows through the subdistrict.

Economy
The local economy is primarily based upon commerce and local industry.

Hospital
Loudi No. 2 Hospital is situated at the subdistrict.

Transportation

Railway
The Luoyang–Zhanjiang Railway, from Luoyang City, Henan Province to Zhanjiang City, Guangdong Province runs through the subdistrict.

The Shanghai–Kunming railway, more commonly known as "Hukun railway", is a west–east railway passing through the subdistrict.

Road
Lianbin Street passes across the subdistrict west to east. And Louxing South Road runs through the subdistrict north to south.

References

External links

Divisions of Louxing District